Paul Thomas may refer to:
 Paul Thomas (academic) (born 1941), Australian university vice-chancellor
 Paul Thomas (basketball) (born 1962), American basketball coach
 Paul Thomas (bishop-designate), British Anglican priest and Bishop-designate of Oswestry
 Paul Thomas (born 1980), American bassist best known as a member of Good Charlotte
 Paul Thomas (cricketer) (born 1971), English cricketer
 Paul Thomas (figure skater), British figure skater
 Paul Thomas (footballer) (born 1982), Australian rules footballer
 Paul Thomas (director) (born 1947), American pornographic actor and director
 Paul Thomas (writer) (born 1951), New Zealand writer
 Paul Richard Thomas (born 1977), French photographer
 Paul Thomas (priest) (born 1955), British Anglican priest
 Paul Thomas (politician), member of the North Dakota House of Representatives
 Paul F. Thomas, United States Coast Guard admiral

See also
 
 
Thomas Paul (disambiguation)